Arnaldo Tomás Ochoa Sánchez (1930 – July 13, 1989) was a Cuban general who was executed by the government of Fidel Castro after being found guilty of a variety of crimes including drug smuggling and treason. Allegations from a former Castro bodyguard claimed that Ochoa was executed, and Interior Minister Jose Abrantes sentenced to a 20-year prison term, allegedly to cover up high level Castro brothers involvement in the drug smuggling trade.

Career
Ever since its creation, he was part of Fidel Castro's 26th of July Movement, and by March 1957 he had joined Castro's guerrilla army in the Sierra Maestra, fighting against dictator Fulgencio Batista. Ochoa played a major role in the fall of Santa Clara, becoming a close friend of Raúl Castro. Ochoa is said to have been the only survivor of the Camilo Cienfuegos loyalists sent on a doomed expedition against the Trujillo dictatorship in the Dominican Republic in 1959.

He also fought against Brigade 2506 in the Bay of Pigs Invasion. E. Bovo, the Curator of the Bay of Pigs Museum, claims that he was not a commander, rather that he served under 'El Gallego' José Ramón Fernández, a former officer under the Batista government.

In 1965 he became a member of the Communist Party of Cuba. Ochoa was a member of the Party's Central Committee for more than twenty years. He attended the War College in Matanzas, Cuba, and was later sent to the Frunze Academy in the Soviet Union. In 1966 Ochoa with the Venezuelan guerrilla commander Luben Petkoff, took a boat to the shores of Falcón, Venezuela, one of his most secretive expedition. Along with 15 other Cuban military was sent by Castro to strengthen Douglas Bravo guerrillas fighting the government of Raúl Leoni that ended in a major strategic loss at large rebel cost.

Between 1967 and 1969, he trained rebels in the Congo. In 1975, Ochoa was sent to fight in a critical campaign against the National Liberation Front of Angola (FNLA) in Luanda, Angola, where he won the respect of both Soviet and Cuban commanders. In 1977 he was named commander of Cuban Expeditionary Forces in Ethiopia under the command of Soviet General Petrov. His successes during the Ogaden War impressed the Soviet commanders in the field.

By 1980, Ochoa was widely considered a great internationalist, and was awarded the title "Hero of the Revolution" by Fidel Castro in 1984. Within the United States Drug Enforcement Agency, Ochoa was known as Castro's top narcotics dealer.

Arrest and execution
Five years later, Ochoa was chosen by Defense Minister Raúl Castro to become the head of Cuba's Western Army. Since this branch of the military protects Cuba's capital city, Havana, and its top leaders and installations, the position would have made him the third most powerful military figure on the island, after Commander in Chief Fidel Castro and General Raúl Castro. What was expected to be a routine background check prior to the announcement of his appointment began to unravel, however, when at appointment, the government accused Ochoa of corruption, which included, but was not limited to, the sale of diamonds and ivory from Angola and the misappropriation of weapons in Nicaragua. As the investigation continued, links were found to other military and Ministry of the Interior officials who were engaged in even more serious crimes: taking pay-offs from South American drug-traffickers, including Pablo Escobar and General Manuel Noriega in exchange for letting them use Cuban territorial waters for drug drops and pick-ups. General Raúl Castro, who was very close to Ochoa personally, later said he pleaded with Ochoa on a number of occasions to come clean, reveal everything, so they could move forward. When Ochoa refused to cooperate, on June 12, the Ministry of the Revolutionary Armed Forces announced his arrest and investigation for serious acts of corruption, dishonest use of economic resources, and abetting drug trafficking.

Ochoa was put behind bars for a month in west Havana, in the military base named Reloj Club Boinas Rojas. During this time his closest friends and associates continued their attempts to persuade him to cooperate in hopes of ameliorating his sentence. During this same time Patricio and Tony de la Guardia and others were apprehended and charged as well. Ochoa and the others finally went before a Military Honour Court. Their three-day trial before a military commission, which provided ample evidence of the crimes that were committed, including dates, places, amounts of money and drugs involved, along with the lesser crimes of smuggling diamonds and ivory for sale, was viewed on Cuban television. During the trial none of the defendants claimed that they had not carried out these acts; only that there were "mitigating circumstances". At one point Ochoa mused over what had brought him to this point, saying that initially he was trying to help secure weapons and other materials needed for his troops, and then one thing led to another. The Military Court found him guilty of all charges, including the capital offense of treason. Prosecutors had presented evidence that at least one pilot involved in the transfer of drugs had been contracted by the CIA, and argued that if the United States government instead of the Cuban government had discovered and revealed the involvement of high level Cuban military personnel in drug trafficking, that would have provided an excuse for invading Cuba (less than a year later, the US invaded Panama using Noriega's alleged involvement in drug trafficking as the justification). Alternatively, they surmised, if Cuba had gone ahead and appointed General Ochoa as head of the Western Army, the US would have been in a good position to blackmail and control one of the people most responsible for the country's security.

Four of the defendants, including Ochoa and Tony de la Guardia, were given death sentences for the crime of treason. The ruling regime claimed that not only had they betrayed the high level of trust in them by the government and people of Cuba, the Court declared, but had placed the entire country in jeopardy by their actions. A related trial, receiving far less attention, saw the sentencing of long-time Fidel Castro confidant and Interior Minister Jose Abrantes to 20 years in prison.

All death penalty convictions in Cuba are automatically sent on appeal to the Council of State, which can affirm, overturn or commute such sentences. The Council of State unanimously confirmed the convictions and death penalty. The charges, conviction and death sentences were extremely upsetting to much of the Cuban population, especially in the case of Arnaldo Ochoa, who was considered by most people in Cuba to be one of the most respected Generals in the Cuban Armed Forces.

At dawn on July 13, 1989, Ochoa was executed by a firing squad at the "Tropas Especiales" military base in Baracoa, Guantánamo. A widely accepted account tells how he asked not to be blindfolded and to give the command to the firing squad himself. Both wishes were granted by Fidel Castro. Another version details the Chief of the Military's Special Troops, Gen. José Luis Mesa Delgado, putting a final bullet in Ochoa's head. A statement in the Granma newspaper the next day announced his execution to the Cuban public. His wife was later informed of an unmarked grave in Havana's Cemetery.

After the execution, according to one of his bodyguards, Fidel Castro sardonically remarked to his brother Raúl Castro that, "Ahora tenemos que encontrar otro Ochoa que nos suministre nuestra cocaína". ("Now we have to find another Ochoa to supply us with our cocaine.")

Notes

External links

 Cuban Armed Forces Review (No relation to Cuban Armed Forces) page on Ochoa
 
 Foro Militar General (Cuban military forum)

1930 births
1989 deaths
People from Cacocum
Cuban people of Basque descent
Communist Party of Cuba politicians
Cuban generals
People of the Cuban Revolution
Cuban military personnel of the Angolan Civil War
Frunze Military Academy alumni
20th-century executions for treason
People executed for treason against Cuba
People executed by Cuba by firing squad
Executed Cuban people
Executed military leaders
20th-century executions by Cuba